Suskityrannus (meaning "coyote tyrant", suski meaning "coyote" in Zuni) is a genus of small tyrannosauroid theropod from the Late Cretaceous in southern Laramidia. It contains a single species, Suskityrannus hazelae, believed to have lived roughly 92 million years ago. The type specimen was found in the Turonian-age Moreno Hill Formation of the Zuni Basin in western New Mexico.

Discovery and naming

First mentioned as a small dromaeosaurid by Wolfe and Kirkland in their description of Zuniceratops, Suskityrannus was informally referred to as the "Zuni coelurosaur", "Zuni tyrannosaur", and by the 2011 documentary Planet Dinosaur "Zunityrannus" prior to its scientific description. The original fossils were found by Robert Denton, a professional geologist from Virginia, and a native Mesa teen Sterling Nesbitt, who was a museum volunteer that came to a dig with paleontologist Doug Wolfe. In 2019 Suskityrannus was formally described as a genus of primitive tyrannosauroid. Both the holotype specimen MSM P4754 (partially articulated skull and a few postcranial bones) and the paratype specimen MSM P6178 (partially articulated and associated remains including a few skull bones and an incomplete postcranial skeleton) are preserved in the collections of the Arizona Museum of Natural History.

Description

Both are likely to have been juveniles. One of the specimens is believed to have been 3 years old when it died, based on bone rings. The skull of Suskityrannus and its foot are more slender than other tyrannosaurs. The species already possesses many key features of the tyrannosaurid body plan, including the phylogenetically earliest record of an arctometatarsalian foot in tyrannosauroids. Additionally, as an early tyrannosaur, Suskityrannus may have had feathers, despite no feathers being found with its fossils.

Doug Wolfe noted that the brain of Suskityrannus was relatively large compared to its body plan.

Classification
Below is the phylogenetic analysis on the placement of Suskityrannus.

Paleobiology

The area in New Mexico where Suskityrannus lived is an area rich in fossils. The fossil record of the Moreno Hill Formation documents a transition period between early Cretaceous fauna and the latest Cretaceous fauna. The area was a thickly forested coastal region with a humid climate. Zuniceratops, Nothronychus, and a few specimens of Jeyawati are known from this region. The formation also contains a currently undescribed ankylosaurid dinosaur. Fossils of a crocodilian and a possible marine turtle belonging to the Cheloniidae, were also found in the same locality as well.

Suskityrannus filled the major phylogenetic, morphological and temporal gaps that researchers needed to piece together tyrannosauroid evolution.

References

Tyrannosaurs
Fossil taxa described in 2019
Late Cretaceous dinosaurs of North America